Gnathothlibus is a genus of moths in the family Sphingidae.

Species
Gnathothlibus australiensis Lachlan, 2004
Gnathothlibus brendelli Hayes, 1983
Gnathothlibus dabrera Eitschberger, 1999
Gnathothlibus eras (Boisduval, 1832)
Gnathothlibus erotus (Cramer, 1777)
Gnathothlibus fijiensis Lachlan, 2009
Gnathothlibus heliodes (Meyrick, 1889)Gnathothlibus meeki Rothschild & Jordan, 1907Gnathothlibus saccoi Lachlan & Moulds, 2001Gnathothlibus samoaensis Lachlan, 2009Gnathothlibus vanuatuensis Lachlan & Moulds, 2003

Natural hybridGnathothlibus collardi'' Haxaire, 2002

References

 
Macroglossini
Moth genera
Taxa named by Hans Daniel Johan Wallengren